Revati (रेवती) is a goddess featured in Hindu scriptures. She is the daughter of King Kakudmi and the consort of Balarama, the elder brother of Krishna, and one of the Dashavatara. Her account is given within a number of Hindu texts such as the Mahabharata and Bhagavata Purana.

Origin 
Revati has her origins as a mother goddess who was capable of great destruction. When Dirgajihvi, a demon, threatened to attack the devas, the gods sought the assistance of Skanda, who in turn requested Revati to fight the former. Taking the form of the vixen Shalavriki, Revati wrought havoc in the demon army to the extent that the demons sought refuge in the wombs of human women. In response, the goddess took the Jataharini form and attacked the demons before their conception, cleansing the women of their wickedness. According to the Devi Bhagavata Purana, Revati is associated with Shasthi Devi, an aspect of Prakriti. She was revered as the deity of children who was worshipped by childless couples, offered veneration on the sixth day after a child's birth. Due to her later association with fortune and wealth, Revati was assimilated as a form of Lakshmi, symbolic with her marriage to the avatar of Vishnu, Balarama.

Legend 
Vishnu Purana narrates the tale of Revati.

Revati was the only daughter of Kakudmi. Feeling that no human could prove to be good enough to marry his lovely and talented daughter, Kakudmi took Revati with him to Brahmaloka—abode of Brahma.

When they arrived, Brahma was listening to a musical performance by the gandharvas, so they waited patiently until the performance was finished. Then, Kakudmi bowed humbly, made his request and presented his shortlist of candidates. Brahma laughed, and explained that time runs differently on different planes of existence and that during the short time they had waited in Brahmaloka to see him, 27 chatur-yugas had passed on Earth and all the candidates had died long ago. Brahma added that Kakudmi was now alone as his friends, ministers, servants, wives, kinsmen, armies and treasures had now vanished from Earth and he should soon bestow his daughter to a husband as Kali Yuga was near.

Kakudmi was overcome with astonishment and alarm at this news. However, Brahma comforted him and added that Vishnu the Preserver was currently on Earth in the forms of Krishna and Balarama and he recommended Balarama as a worthy husband for Revati.

Kakudmi and Revati then returned to earth, which they regarded as having left only just a short while ago. They were shocked by the changes that had taken place. Not only had the landscape and environment changed, but over the intervening 27 chatur-yugas, in the cycles of human spiritual and cultural evolution, mankind was at a lower level of development than in their own time. The Bhagavata Purana describes that they found the race of men had become "dwindled in stature, reduced in vigour, and enfeebled in intellect." The king's capital of Kushasthali had been renamed Dvaraka.

Kakudmi and Revati found Balarama, and proposed the marriage. Because she was from an earlier yuga, Revati was far taller and larger than her husband-to-be, but Balarama, tapped his plough (his characteristic weapon) on her shoulder, and she shrunk to the normal height of people in Balarama's age. The marriage was then celebrated.

Revati bore her husband sons, Nishatha and Ulmuka and daughter, Sasirekha. Nishatha and Ulmuka were killed in the Yadu fratricidal war, after which Balarama also ended his earthly incarnation in meditation by the sea. Revati ascended the funeral pyre of her husband.

Notes and references

Characters in the Mahabharata
Hindu goddesses
People who committed sati
Lakshmi